Nonia is a genus of snout moths described by George Hampson in 1901.

Species
 Nonia belizae Neunzig & Dow, 1993
 Nonia exiguella (Ragonot, 1888)

References

Phycitinae
Taxa named by George Hampson
Pyralidae genera